William Toner (18 December 1929 – 16 March 1999) was a Scottish football player and manager, who played for Celtic, Sheffield United, Kilmarnock, Hibernian and Ayr United. He represented the Scotland national football team twice, and later managed Dumbarton.

His son Kevin became a Scottish Premier League referee.

Honours 
Kilmarnock
Scottish Cup: runner-up 1956–57, 1959–60 
Scottish League Cup: runner-up 1960–61

Dumbarton
Stirlingshire Cup: 1964-65

References

External links 
 
 

1929 births
1999 deaths
Footballers from Glasgow
Association football defenders
Scottish footballers
Scotland international footballers
Celtic F.C. players
Sheffield United F.C. players
Kilmarnock F.C. players
Hibernian F.C. players
Ayr United F.C. players
Scottish Football League players
English Football League players
Scottish football managers
Dumbarton F.C. managers
Scottish Football League representative players
Scottish Football League managers
Glasgow United F.C. players
Scottish Junior Football Association players